The Women's 1 km time trial (B&VI 1–3) at the 2008 Summer Paralympics took place on 7 September at the Laoshan Velodrome.

The world record was broken during the event, by Aileen McGlynn and her pilot, Ellen Hunter (Great Britain). They took over two seconds off their previous world record set in 2006, and over three seconds off the Paralympic record they set in Athens in 2004.

Records

PR = Paralympic Record
WR = World Record

Results

References 

Women's 1 km time trial (BandVI 1-3)
Para